Gulshan Kumar Mehta, popularly known by his pen name Gulshan Bawra (literally: "Gulshan The Mad") (12 April 1937 – 7 August 2009), was an Indian songwriter and actor in Hindi cinema. In a career spanning 42 years, he has to his credit about 240 songs, he collaborated with noted music directors like Kalyanji Anandji, Shankar Jaikishan, and R. D. Burman. He composed almost half of the songs in films like Khel Khel Mein (1975), Kasme Vaade (1978) and Satte Pe Satta (1982). Apart from R. D. Burman hits, he is most remembered for his songs like 'Mere Desh Ki Dharti" in Upkaar (1968) and "Yaari Hai Imaan Mera" in Zanjeer (1974), both of which got him the Filmfare Best Lyricist Award. The latter also topped the Binaca Geetmala annual list of 1973. As a character actor, he also appeared in a small number of Hindi films.

Early life and education
Gulshan Kumar Mehta, popularly known as Gulshan Bawra was born 30 km from Lahore in a place called Sheikhupura. His father had a construction business, and his immediate family were Shri Labh Chand Mehta, father of Roop Lal Mehta and Chaman Lal Mehta, incidentally both their families were victims of the partition riots where young Gulshan witnessed his father and his cousins' father killed in Labh Chand Mehta's haveli, in front of their own eyes. His elder sister at Jaipur, brought him and his elder brother up. After his brother got a job, they shifted to Delhi, where he graduated from Delhi University. During college, he began to write poetry.

Career
He wanted to come into films and applied for a job with the Railways. He was posted to Kota, Rajasthan, but when he arrived there, the vacancy was filled. His next call was luckily that for the post of a clerk at Mumbai and he arrived in the city in 1955.  Gulshan struggled to get a film break, initially keeping his job on. Kalyanji (of Kalyanji-Anandji), then on his own as Kalyanji Virji Shah, gave him his first opening in Chandrasena (1959) in the song "Main kya jaanu kahan laage yeh saawan matwala re", sung by Lata Mangeshkar.

K-A's first joint film, the Meena Kumari-Balraj Sahni starrer Satta Bazaar later the same year marked his first brush with success with hits like "Tumhein yaad hoga kabhi hum mile the" (Lata-Hemant), "Aakde ka dhanda" (Rafi) and "Chandi ke chand tukdon ke liye" (Hemant Kumar). It was during the making of this film that the film's distributor Shantibhai Patel christened him "Bawra".

Almost half of his songs have been with R.D.Burman. His last release was Zulmi (1999) and his last hit was "Le pappiyaan jhappiyaan paale hum" for Haqeeqat (1995), which landed him in his only controversy - of writing a vulgar song.  His films in the '90s include, besides Haqeeqat and Zulmi, Qurbani Rang Jaayegi, Tehkiqaat, Laat Saab, Maidan-E-Jung, Indrajeet and Chor Pe Mor.

He died on 7 August 2009 at age 72 at his Pali Hill residence in Mumbai.

Filmography

As actor
 Jija Ji (1961) Punjabi movie
 Ek Din Ka Badshah (1964)
 Upkar (1967)
Parivar  (1967)
 Vishwas (1969)
 Pavitra Paapi (1970)
 Pyar Ki Kahani (1971)
 Jaane-Anjaane (1971)
 Jangal Mein Mangal (1972)
 Shehzada (1972)
 Zanjeer (1973).. acted in song "Deewane Hain Diwanon Ko Na"
 Lafange (1975)
 Jai Mata Di (1977) Punjabi Movie 
 Agar... If (1977)
 Aap Ke Deewane (1980)
 Yeh Vaada Raha (1982)
 Agar Tum Na Hote (1983)
 Boxer (1984)
Indrajeet (1991)
 Basera
 Shrikant
 English Babu Desi Mem (1996)

As lyricist
 Satta Bazaar (1959)
 Purnima (1965)
 Upkar (1967)
 Zanjeer (1973)
 Haath Ki Safai (1974)
 Trimurti (1974)
 Khel Khel Mein (1975)
 Khalifa (1976)
 Vishwasghaat (1976)
 Kasme Vaade (1978)
 Bhala Manus (1979)
 Jhoota Kahin Ka (1979)
 Satte Pe Satta (1982)
 Yeh Vaada Raha (1982)
 Agar Tum Na Hote (1983)
 Awaaz (1984)
 Haqeeqat (1995)
 Rafoo chakkar (1975)

Noted lyrics

Awards

References

External links
 
 Gulshan Bawra at Bollywood Hungama
 

2009 deaths
1937 births
Filmfare Awards winners
Indian male songwriters
Indian lyricists
People from Sheikhupura District
Hindi-language lyricists
Male actors in Hindi cinema
Delhi University alumni
Punjabi people
Pseudonymous writers
20th-century Indian male actors
20th-century Indian musicians
20th-century male musicians